The table below lists the judgments of the Constitutional Court of South Africa delivered in 2003.

The members of the court at the start of 2003 were Chief Justice Arthur Chaskalson, Deputy Chief Justice Pius Langa, and judges Lourens Ackermann, Richard Goldstone, Tholie Madala, Yvonne Mokgoro, Dikgang Moseneke, Sandile Ngcobo, Kate O'Regan, Albie Sachs and Zak Yacoob. Justice Goldstone retired in November and Justice Ackermann retired at the end of the year.

References

 
 

2003
Constitutional Court
Constitutional Court of South Africa